The Sassoon family, known as "Rothschilds of the East" due to the immense wealth they accumulated in finance and trade, are a Baghdadi Jewish family. 

Originally based in Baghdad, Iraq, they later moved to Bombay, India, and then emigrated to China, England, and other nations.

The family's businesses in China, India and Hong Kong especially, were built to capitalise on the opium business. As more family members gravitated toward London, they became prominent in England and were ennobled by Queen Victoria. 

From the 18th century, the Sassoons were one of the wealthiest families in the world, with a corporate empire spanning the entire continent of Asia.

Etymology

The name of the family strongly implies a local, Mesopotamian origin. The family name of Sassoon is also commonly shared by many Kurdish families and tribes who all originate from the mountainous district of Sason (whence the family and tribal names), west of Lake Van, in upper Mesopotamia in modern Turkey. It is, however, possible that some Spanish Sephardi blood was mixed with the primarily Mesopotamian Jewish Sasoons.

Origins
Sassoon ben Salih (1750–1830) and his family were the chief treasurers to the pashas of Baghdad and Southern Iraq. His sons David (1792–1864) and Joseph Sassoon (1795–1872) fled from a new and unfriendly wāli. In 1828 David first went to the Persian Gulf port of Bushehr and in 1832 to Bombay, India, with his large family. In Bombay, he built the international business called David S. Sassoon, with the policy of staffing it with people brought from Baghdad. They filled the functions of the various branches of his business in India, Burma, Malaya, and east Asia. He cemented the family's dominant position in the Sino-Indian opium trade.  The family's businesses in China, and Hong Kong especially, were built to capitalise on the opium business. His business extended to China – where Sassoon House (now the north wing of the Peace Hotel) on the Bund in Shanghai became a noted landmark – and then to England. In each branch, he maintained a rabbi. His wealth and munificence were proverbial; his philanthropy across Asia included the building of schools, orphanages, hospitals, and museums with the proceeds of the drug trade. On his death, tributes to him were made from across the continent by Muslims, Christians, Parsees, Jews, and Hindus. An important Jewish banker named Sassoon was hanged by the Ottoman Turks at the conclusion of the Siege of Kut al Amarah in April 1916. He may have been a member of this branch of the family or of Joseph Sassoon (vide infra).

Joseph Sassoon sons

Joseph Sassoon went to Aleppo, Syria, where he established a merchant house and later his business interests spread to Alexandria, Thessaloniki, and Athens, which included a shipping company and a money exchange house. His five sons branched out in many directions: his son Moses Sassoon (1828–1909) returned to Baghdad before moving to Egypt where he built the financial house Joseph Sassoon & Sons, which later expanded and became an agent for Crédit Foncier in Egypt. In 1871 Moses' son Jacob Sassoon (1850–1936) was one of the largest cotton plantation owners in Egypt, and owned cotton mills; during the American civil war, his older brother Nissim (1840–1917) had made a fortune exporting Egyptian cotton to England making him Egypt's largest cotton exporter. In 1927, with Misr Bank and other Egyptian businessmen, Jacob Sassoon founded the Misr Spinning and Weaving Company (Arabic: شركة مصر للغزل والنسيج), also known as Misr Helwan or the El-Ghazl factory owning 61% of the company's shares. Jacob Sassoon also founded Egypt Crédit Foncier with Joseph Vita Mosseri, his grandson Eliau Joseph Sassoon was an architect, and designed the Assicurazioni Generali di Trieste Building. Eliau Sassoon was also a real estate investor and developer, who foresaw the unparalleled growth of Cairo and the lucrative effect such expansion would have on land values. It is not surprising, therefore, that many of the properties he invested in were located at the nexus of the elegant European quarter of Ismailia or in the choicest parts of Kasr al-Dubara, and later, in Garden City, Zamalek, and Giza. In 1952 his grandson Eliau (Elias) Nissim Eliau Joseph Sassoon (1928–2010) founded Banque du Caire with Maurice Joseph Cattaui (1925–2009).

Eliau (Elias) Nissim Joseph Sassoon

Eliau (Elias) Nissim Eliau Joseph Sassoon (Hebrew: אליהו נסים אליאו יוסף ששון) (1928-2010), (always called Elias), born in Aleppo, Syria, to Nassim Eliau Sassoon (1911–1988) a wealthy merchant, banker, and former partner at Safra Freres a bank based in Aleppo, and Messouda Sassoon (born Shamash) (1911–1992).

Elias Sassoon was Joseph Sassoon's most influential and wealthiest descendant, in 1940 he was sent to Alexandria to attend the prestigious boarding school, Victoria College. He later joined his family's business in 1946 where he worked for the family's business in Egypt.

Among the many holdings, the family had at the time included interests in Burmah Oil, Turkish Petroleum Company and the Anglo-Iranian Oil Company, a textile factory, a large cotton export business and interests in both the General Company of Commerce and Industry of Greece (later Attica Enterprises Holding S.A.) and Atlas Maritime.

In 1947 Elias focused his attention on three primary sectors: the newly booming oil exploration industry sweeping the Middle East, shipping and banking. With a £5,000 loan from his father, Elias invested in Standard Oil adding to his family's existing holdings in the company. That same year he married Hannah Rochel Jacque Sassoon (née de Menasche) (1929–2009), granddaughter of Baron Jacques Bohor Yacoub Levi de Menashe (d.1916).

His great-grandfather, David Solomon Sassoon (1871–1956) had been an investor in Socony-Vacuum Oil Company, which later partnered with Standard Oil to provide markets for the oil reserves in the Middle East. In 1906, Socony (later Mobil) opened its first fuel terminals in Alexandria with financing provided by David Solomon Sassoon. Elias Sassoon was a devoted Zionist and considered the British anything but friends to the Jewish people because of their blockade in the Mediterranean to refugee vessels carrying Jewish refugees fleeing the horrors of World War II, and although to a lesser extent, he considered the British government as culpable nonetheless in the atrocities against world Jewry.

In 1952 he cofounded Banque du Caire with his childhood friend Moise Joseph Maurice Cattaui (1925–2009). By then Elias Sassoon had expanded his family's business to France, Brazil, South Africa and the United States where the family exported cotton to and had maintained trading posts since the 1800s.

The Sassoons believed that Mesopotamia (now Syria and Iraq) contained substantial reservoirs of oil, the forerunner of the Iraq Petroleum Company (IPC) the Turkish Petroleum Company (TPC). David Solomon Sassoon was among the first to secure the interest of the Imperial German banks and companies, already involved in the building of the Berlin–Baghdad railway, which he played an active role in its financing. This German interest was followed by British interests when David Sassoon became an agent for the Rothschilds in Ottoman Empire. In 1911, in an attempt to bring together British and German interests competing in the region, Sassoon formed a consortium of British investors composed of banks and companies and formed the African and Eastern Concession Ltd.

In 1953 Elias Sassoon used these networks of interests to expand his family's investment interests to include mining concessions in Africa. In 1957 the new Egyptian post-revolution government under Nasser nationalized all European particularly British and French companies and banks. The government also began expelling foreigners and the Jewish community of Egypt once again, despite its many contributions to the country's artistic, economic, political, and academic fields found itself under the government's harassment and intimidation, many were forced to leave the country with no more than one suitcase and most had their assets and properties seized by the Revolutionary Council.

The Sassoons were among those, whose assets were confiscated and in 1966 Elias Sassoon and his wife were taken to the port in Alexandria and expelled from the country. Elias’ wife who was an Egyptian citizen was declared non-citizen, and at the request of the Egyptian government, Elias's Syrian citizenship was revoked. They were given laissez-passer (travel documents) and ordered aboard a ship bound for Greece, however, their son Edouard Elias Sassoon (1948–1985) who was a medical student at the University of Alexandria was denied an exit visa.

The government accused Elias Sassoon of using his family's banking network to help smuggle assets belonging to members of the Jewish community out of the country and demanded that he return his assets held in Europe before his son is allowed to leave. After paying what amounted to ransom money, totaling £4 million and the intervention of both the French and the Greek governments, Edouard Sassoon joined his family in 1971, with his wife Josephine Celine Esther (née Cattaui) (1949–1994), daughter of Moise Cattaui who was also denied exit visa after her family was expelled from the country in 1964.

Elias Sassoon had established Sassoon Cattaui Investment Holding (later Providence Group), a privately owned family hedge fund with Moise Cattaui in 1961 in Switzerland with assets from the Sassoon Family Trust, which had been formed in Lausanne, Switzerland in 1910. In 1970, the partners moved the company Curaçao (Netherlands Antilles) a private family investment group, which is not required to register with the SEC or comply with reporting requirements under the Dodd–Frank, reform act.  It is said that at the time of the formation of the Fund, the total value of assets under management in 1961 was £25million.

The Fund invested in commercial real estate properties in the U.S., Canada, and Greece as well as in precious metals, oil & gas, and securities. The fund also speculated in the currency markets, among its many holdings are: BHP, the co-investor in Le Méridien hotel company with Air France, American Express, General Motors, Wells Fargo, HSBC, Lehman Brothers, ExxonMobil, Conoco Phillips, Fendi, Giorgio Armani, Microsoft, Sun Microsystems, Midland Bank, stockbroking firm Frankel Pollak (which was later sold to Sasfin Bank, a Sassoon family bank based in South Africa) and S&P Global. It is rumoured that at the time of Elias Sassoon's death, the Fund, which is not required to file its financials with the SEC had over $100 billion of assets under management, most of which are assets of both the Sassoon and Cattaui families.

David S. Sassoon sons

Sassoon's eight sons also branched out in many directions. The Sassoon family was heavily involved in the shipping and opium production industry in China and India. Elias David (1820–1880), his son by his first wife, had been the first of the sons to go to China, in 1844. He later returned to Bombay, before leaving the firm to establish E.D. Sassoon & Co. in 1867, with offices in Bombay and Shanghai. Another son, Albert Abdullah David Sassoon (1818–1896) took on the running of the firm on his father's death, and notably constructed the Sassoon Docks, the first wet dock built in western India. With two of his brothers he later became prominent in England, and the family were friends of the Prince of Wales, later King Edward VII. One daughter of the family, Rachel Sassoon Beer, joined her husband in running a number of British newspapers, including The Sunday Times (1893–1904) and The Observer, which she also edited.

Of those who settled in England, Sir Edward Albert Sassoon (1856–1912), the son of Albert, married Aline Caroline de Rothschild, and was a Conservative member of Parliament from 1899 until his death. The seat was then inherited by his son Sir Philip Sassoon (1888–1939) from 1912 until his death. Philip served in the First World War as military secretary to Field Marshal Sir Douglas Haig and, during the 1920s and 1930s, as Britain's undersecretary of state for air. The twentieth-century English poet, one of the best known World War I poets, Siegfried Sassoon (1886–1967) was David's great-grandson.

Another descendant of David Sassoon is the British banker and former Treasury's commercial secretary James Meyer Sassoon. He was mentioned in the Paradise Papers as one of the beneficiaries of a tax-exempt Cayman Island trust fund worth $236 million in 2007 and defended it as being of non-UK origin.

The branch which carried on the rabbinical tradition has been represented by Rabbi Solomon David Sassoon (1915–1985), who moved from Letchworth to London and then to Jerusalem in 1970. He was the son of one David Solomon Sassoon (1880–1942) who collected Jewish books and manuscripts and catalogued them in two volumes.

The bulk of this collection is stored at the British Library in London, England. Some examples of this collection are maintained at the University of Toronto Library in Toronto, Canada. None of these priceless works are presently stored in the United States.

David Sassoon was the son of Flora Abraham, who had moved from India to England in 1901 and established a famous salon in her London home. Solomon Sassoon had two sons, Isaac S. D. Sassoon and David Solomon Sassoon, who are both rabbis.

Vidal Sassoon was distantly related to the family via his father, David Sassoon, from London.

Family tree

References

Further reading

External links
 Elkebir Family Tree, showing the ancestry of the Sassoon family back to the 18th century.
 
 "The Sassoons" Exhibit at the Jewish Museum in Manhattan from March 3 to August 13, 2023. Review in The New York Times. Review in The Wall Street Journal.

 
Iraqi families
Political families of Iraq
People from Baghdad
Jewish Chinese history
Jewish Hong Kong history
Jewish Indian history
Jewish Iraqi history